The 2016–17 NJIT Highlanders men's basketball team represented the New Jersey Institute of Technology during the 2016–17 NCAA Division I men's basketball season. The Highlanders, led by first-year head coach Brian Kennedy, played their home games at the Fleisher Center in Newark, New Jersey as members of the Atlantic Sun Conference (ASUN). They finished the season 11–20, 3–11 in ASUN play to finish in a tie for seventh place. They lost in the quarterfinals of the ASUN tournament to Lipscomb.

This season was the Highlanders' final season playing at Fleisher Center. The school opened the new Wellness and Events Center for the 2017–18 season.

Previous season
The Highlanders finished the 2015–16 season 20–15, 8–6 in A-Sun play to finish in to finish in a three-way tie for second place. They lost in the quarterfinals of the A-Sun tournament to Stetson. They were invited to the CollegeInsider.com Tournament where they defeated Army, Boston University, and Texas–Arlington to advance to the semifinals where they lost to Columbia.

On April 1, 2016 head coach Jim Engles resigned to become the head coach at Columbia. He finished at NJIT with an eight-year record of 111–139. On April 13, the school hired assistant Brian Kennedy as head coach.

Roster

Schedule and results

|-
!colspan=9 style=| Non-conference regular season

|-
!colspan=9 style=| Atlantic Sun Conference regular season

|-
!colspan=9 style=| Atlantic Sun Tournament

References

NJIT Highlanders men's basketball seasons
Njit